The Arthur Jordan Memorial Hall, often referred to as "Jordan Hall", is a historic building on the campus of Butler University in Indianapolis, Indiana. It is one of the original buildings of the campus, along with Atherton Union and Hinkle Fieldhouse. It was designed by architect Robert Frost Daggett and built in 1928. A four-story, Collegiate Gothic style building, it is a reinforced concrete structure with bearing walls of pink granite with limestone trim.

It was added to the National Register of Historic Places in June, 1983.

Use
Jordan Hall houses the offices of the President of the University, provost, and the dean of the College of Liberal Arts and Sciences. The majority of the courses of the College of Liberal Arts and Sciences at Butler are in Jordan Hall.

Gallery

References

External links

Butler University
University and college buildings on the National Register of Historic Places in Indiana
Collegiate Gothic architecture in Indiana
Buildings and structures completed in 1928
Buildings and structures in Indianapolis
National Register of Historic Places in Indianapolis